Tyler Lynn Farr (born February 5, 1984) is an American country music singer and songwriter. Originally signed to BNA Records Farr released two singles for the label before it closed. He transferred to Columbia Records Nashville, releasing two albums: Redneck Crazy in 2013 and Suffer in Peace in 2015. Overall he has charted eight singles on the Billboard Hot Country Songs and Country Airplay charts. His highest ranking on the latter chart is "A Guy Walks Into a Bar" which placed at No. 1 in 2015.

Biography
Tyler Farr grew up in Garden City, Missouri and attended Missouri State University getting a degree in voice.

Farr co-wrote the songs "Hey Y'all" for Cole Swindell and "She's Just Like That" for Joe Nichols. In early 2012, Farr released his debut single, "Hot Mess" which he co-wrote with Rhett Akins. Billy Dukes of Taste of Country gave the song four stars out of five, calling Farr's voice "unique, but not distracting." Following the merger of his original label, BNA Records, Farr moved to Columbia Nashville and released his second single, "Hello Goodbye". His third single, "Redneck Crazy", became his first Top 10 hit in 2013. Next was the top 3 hit "Whiskey in My Water". All four singles were included on his debut album, Redneck Crazy which was released on September 30, 2013.

Farr led off his second album in mid-2014 with "A Guy Walks Into a Bar". The album, entitled Suffer in Peace, was released on April 28, 2015 and "A Guy Walks Into a Bar" became Farr's first No. 1 single on Billboard Country Airplay in May 2015. The album's second single, "Withdrawals"  was released to country radio on June 15, 2015. It had only reached number 52 on the Country Airplay chart when it was pulled from radio and "Better in Boots" was issued as a third single on August 17, 2015. The decision to change the single was made in order to give Farr an up-tempo, "female friendly" song that he could sing live, according to Steve Hodges of Sony Nashville.

"Our Town", Farr's eighth single release was issued in late 2016. Singer Seth Ennis co-wrote the song.

In September 2018, Farr parted ways with Sony Music Nashville. Farr signed with Broken Bow Records in March 2019 under Jason Aldean's newly-founded imprint Night Train Records, and released the EP Only Truck in Town on June 5, 2020. The title track and "Soundtrack to a Small Town Sundown" were released as singles.

Musical styles
Farr is also a classically trained opera singer and took voice lessons during his teenage years; he sang tenor in Missouri's All-State Choir during his senior year of high school. He claims he discovered (and fell in love with) country music after his mother married George Jones' touring guitarist.

Personal life
Farr married his long-time girlfriend, Hannah Freeman on October 10, 2016.

Discography

Studio albums

Extended plays

Singles

Notes

Promotional singles

Other charted songs

Music videos

Filmography

References

External links

1984 births
American country singer-songwriters
American male singer-songwriters
BNA Records artists
Columbia Records artists
Living people
Country musicians from Missouri
People from Cass County, Missouri
Singer-songwriters from Missouri
21st-century American singers
21st-century American male singers
BBR Music Group artists